David M. Gallegos is an American politician serving as a member of the New Mexico Senate from the 41st district. Gallegos previously served in the New Mexico House of Representatives and was a member of the Eunice, New Mexico School Board for 21 years. He currently serves on the Senate Conservation Committee and the Senate Health and Public Affairs Committee.

Elections
2012 When District 61 Republican Representative Shirley Tyler left the Legislature and left the seat open, Gallegos was unopposed for the June 5, 2012 Republican Primary, winning with 791 votes and won the November 6, 2012 General election with 3,654 votes (64.5%) against Democratic nominee Hector Ramirez.
2020 Gallegos ran for the New Mexico State Senate in 2020. In the June 2 primary, he unseated incumbent state Senator Gregg Fulfer.

References

External links
Official page at the New Mexico Legislature

David M. Gallegos at Ballotpedia
David M. Gallegos at OpenSecrets

Place of birth missing (living people)
Year of birth missing (living people)
Living people
Hispanic and Latino American state legislators in New Mexico
Republican Party members of the New Mexico House of Representatives
People from Lea County, New Mexico
21st-century American politicians